Heneglwys (meaning 'Old Church') is a village in Anglesey, in north-west Wales. St Llwydian's Church is of 12th century origin. It is in the community of Bodffordd.

Notable people 
 Geoffrey Glyn (died 1557), lawyer, founded Friars School, Bangor.
 William Glyn (1504–1558), Bishop of Bangor, 1555/8.

References

Villages in Anglesey